KWRF may refer to:

 KWRF (AM), a radio station (860 AM) licensed to Warren, Arkansas, United States
 KWRF-FM, a radio station (105.5 FM) licensed to Warren, Arkansas, United States